OWE is Opportunistic Wireless Encryption, an encryption standard for open Wi-Fi networks.

OWE or Owe may also refer to:

 Oriental Wrestling Entertainment, founded by the wrestler Cima
 Owe, a surname or given name

See also
 Big Owe, a nickname for the Olympic Stadium, Montreal, Canada